Kalaw Township is a township of Taunggyi District in the Shan State of Myanmar. The principal town is Kalaw. This township contains Kalaw, Aungban and Heho.

 
Townships of Shan State
Taunggyi District